Priene is a genus of predatory sea snails, marine gastropod mollusks in the family Ranellidae, the triton snails, triton shells or tritons.

Species
Species within the genus Priene include:

 Priene scabrum (King, 1832)

References

Ranellidae
Monotypic gastropod genera